Zhang Yuzhuo (born 5 January 1962) is a Chinese business executive and politician currently serving as party branch secretary of the China Association for Science and Technology and Communist Party secretary and chairman of the State-owned Assets Supervision and Administration Commission of the State Council. He is an alternate member of the 19th Central Committee of the Chinese Communist Party.

Biography
Zhang was born in Shouguang County, Shandong, on 5 January 1962. After resuming the college entrance examination, in 1978, he was admitted to Shandong University of Science and Technology, where he majored in coal mine survey. After completing his master's degree at General Academy of Coal Sciences, he attended the University of Science and Technology Beijing where he obtained his doctor's degree in 1989. He carried out postdoctoral research at the University of Southampton in September 1992. He was a visiting research fellow at Southern Illinois University in October 1993.

Zhang began his career as an assistant engineer at the Beijing Mining Research Institute, General Academy of Coal Sciences in July 1985, becoming deputy director in 1994, vice president in 1997 and president in 1999. In January 2002, he became deputy general manager of China's largest coal miner Shenhua Group, and was appointed general manager in December 2008. After this office was terminated in May 2011, he rose to become its chairman, serving until March 2017.

He entered politics in March 2017, when he was transferred to Tianjin, where he was a member of the Standing Committee of the Chinese Communist Party's Tianjin Municipal Committee and party chief of Binhai New Area.

On 17 January 2020, he was appointed chairman of China Petrochemical Corporation, but having held the position for only one and a half years. In August 2021, he was appointed party branch secretary of the China Association for Science and Technology.

On 27 December 2022, he was appointed party secretary of the State-owned Assets Supervision and Administration Commission (SASAC), succeeding Hao Peng. On 3 February 2023, he was appointed as the chairman of SASAC.

Honours and awards
 December 2011 Member of the Chinese Academy of Engineering (CAE)

References

1962 births
Living people
People from Shouguang
Shandong University of Science and Technology alumni
University of Science and Technology Beijing alumni
Alumni of the University of Southampton
Tsinghua University alumni
People's Republic of China politicians from Shandong
Chinese Communist Party politicians from Shandong
Members of the Chinese Academy of Engineering
Alternate members of the 19th Central Committee of the Chinese Communist Party